Arsenic acid or trihydrogen arsenate is the chemical compound with the formula . Arsenate and phosphate salts behave very similarly. Arsenic acid as such has not been isolated, but is only found in solution, where it is largely ionized. Its hemihydrate form does form stable crystals. Crystalline samples dehydrate with condensation at 100 °C.

Properties
It is a tetrahedral species of idealized symmetry C3v with As–O bond lengths ranging from 1.66 to 1.71 Å.

Being a triprotic acid, its acidity is described by three equilibria:

, pKa1 = 2.19
, pKa2 = 6.94
, pKa3 = 11.5

These pKa values are close to those for phosphoric acid. The highly basic arsenate ion is the product of the third ionization. Unlike phosphoric acid, arsenic acid is an oxidizer, as illustrated by its ability to convert iodide to iodine.

Preparation
Arsenic acid is prepared by treating arsenic trioxide with concentrated nitric acid. Dinitrogen trioxide is produced as a by-product.

The resulting solution is cooled to give colourless crystals of the hemihydrate , although the dihydrate  is produced when crystallisation occurs at lower temperatures.

Other methods
Arsenic acid is slowly formed when arsenic pentoxide is dissolved in water, and when meta- or pyroarsenic acid is treated with cold water. Arsenic acid can also be prepared directly from elemental arsenic by moistening it and treating with ozone.

Applications
Commercial applications of arsenic acid are limited by its toxicity. It is a precursor to a variety of pesticides. It has found occasional use as a wood preservative, a broad-spectrum biocide, a finishing agent for glass and metal, and a reagent in the synthesis of some dyestuffs and organic arsenic compounds.

Safety
Arsenic acid is extremely toxic and carcinogenic, like all arsenic compounds. It is also corrosive. The  in rabbits is 6 mg/kg (0.006 g/kg).

References

Arsenates
Arsenic(V) compounds
Oxoacids
Oxidizing acids